The Carleton Heights Women's Cash was an annual bonspiel on the women's Ontario Curling Tour. It is held annually at the beginning of September at the Carleton Heights Curling Club in Ottawa, Ontario.

Past champions

References

Ontario Curling Tour events
Curling in Ottawa
Women's curling competitions in Canada